Christopher Paul Basham (born 20 July 1988) is an English professional footballer who plays as a defensive midfielder or centre back for  club Sheffield United. He is best known as a pioneer of the role of the overlapping centre back (usually on the right flank), a position he developed under Chris Wilder during the 2016-17 season.  

Having started as a junior with Newcastle United, he played for Bolton Wanderers, as well as having loan spells at Stafford Rangers and Rochdale, prior to joining Blackpool in August 2010.

Career

Bolton Wanderers
Basham was a member of the youth team at Newcastle United before being released at age sixteen. Soon after, he joined  Bolton Wanderers, where he signed his first professional contract with the club, signing a two-year deal. In November 2006 Basham joined Conference National side Stafford Rangers on a month's loan, making his debut on 25 November in a 2–2 home draw with St Albans City. After four appearances for Rangers, Basham returned to Bolton when his loan deal expired.

On 7 February 2008, Basham joined League Two side Rochdale on loan until the end of the 2007–08 season. Making his debut on 12 February 2008 in a 4–2 home defeat to Hereford United, Basham went on to make a total of 13 appearances for his temporary employers, helping Rochdale to finish fifth in the league and qualify for the League Two play-offs.

The following season saw Basham make his senior debut for Bolton Wanderers as an 89th-minute substitute in the 4–1 win over Sunderland at the Stadium of Light on 29 November 2008. He scored his first goal on 11 April 2009, in a 4–3 defeat to Chelsea at Stamford Bridge, and eventually made a total of eleven appearances that season.

The following season saw Basham making his first appearance came on 29 August 2009, where he came on as a substitute in the second half, in a 3–2 loss against Liverpool, followed up by assisting a winning goal for Gary Cahill, in a 3–2 win over Portsmouth on 12 September 2009. On 6 November 2009, and after 17 appearances for the club, Basham signed a contract extension with Bolton until the summer of 2012. Remaining on the fringes of the first-team Basham made a total of eight league and two cup appearances in the 2009–10 season before an injury kept him out for the rest of the season.

Blackpool
On 6 August 2010, Bolton Wanderers turned down a bid from newly promoted Premier League side Blackpool. Eventually, Blackpool made a second bid for Basham, which was accepted by the club and the next day, on 13 August 2010, Basham signed a three-year contract with Blackpool for a fee reported to be in the region of £1million.

The following day after signing for the club, Basham made his debut as a 60th-minute substitute for Marlon Harewood as Blackpool marked their Premier League debut on the opening day of the 2010–11 season with a 4–0 win over Wigan Athletic at the DW Stadium. It wasn't until 10 November when he made his second league appearance, playing the whole game against Aston Villa in a 3–2 loss. However, Basham spent the most of the season on the reserve bench or injured and at the end of the season, the club were relegated to the Championship.

After appearing in three matches at the start of the 2011–12 season, Basham suffered an injury that kept him out for a month. He was expected to be sent out on loan following his recovery, however he was recalled to the first team due to the club's injury crisis. On 10 December 2011, Basham scored his first goal for Blackpool, heading the first equaliser of a 2–2 away draw at Southampton. His second goal for the club came on 21 January 2012, in a 2–1 win over Crystal Palace. He made 21 appearances during the season in all competitions, scoring twice.

In the 2012–13 season, Basham appeared in and out of the first team at the start of the season, due to being on the sidelines and played in the reserve. By the time he suffered ankle injury in early-December, he made seven appearances. After returning from injury, Basham then scored his first Blackpool on 29 December 2012, in a 4–2 loss against Middlesbrough. As the 2012–13 season progressed, Basham remained in the first team despite suffering from injuries during a match against Leicester City that kept him out for a month and went on to finish the 2012–13 season, making 28 appearances and scoring once in all competitions. Following this, Blackpool opted to take up their option of a contract extension, keeping Basham under contract until summer 2014.

In the 2013–14 season, Basham began to establish himself in the first team and started well, helping the club go unbeaten for the first six matches to the start of the season, including scoring his first goal of the season, in a 1–1 draw against Middlesbrough on 17 August 2013. After appearing four matches throughout September, including scoring another against Leicester City, Basham's performance earned him Wonga.com Player of the Month award for September. Despite missing out on two occasions, due to injury and suspension, Basham continued to be in the first team throughout the season and went on to make 42 appearances in all competitions.

At the end of the 2013–14 season, Basham was offered a new contract by the club.

Sheffield United
On 5 June 2014, Basham signed a three-year deal with Sheffield United on a free transfer after his contract with Blackpool came to an end. Upon joining the club, Basham was given number six shirt for the new season.

Basham made his Sheffield United debut in a 2–1 loss against Bristol City in the opening game of the season, playing 86 minutes before being substituted. He became a first team regular at the club and was praised by manager Nigel Clough, playing most of the season in midfield or centre-back positions. As the 2014–15 season progressed, he continued to be in the first team unless suspended or injured. In the League One play-offs, Basham played both legs against Swindon Town and scored in the second leg, a 5–5 draw. However, this was not enough to progress, having previously lost the first leg 2–1. He finished his first season at the club making 50 appearances in all competitions (37 in the league).

In the 2015–16 season, Basham continued to be a first team regular following the arrival of manager Nigel Adkins. He captained the club for the first time against Doncaster Rovers on 26 September 2015, also scoring his first goal of the season in a 3–1 win. Basham went on to captain the team on five occasions following Jay McEveley's absence. His second goal of the season came on 28 November 2015, in a 1–1 draw against Barnsley. Basham also scored against Walsall in April. Despite missing two league matches due to injuries, he made 49 appearances in all competitions, scoring three goals.

In the 2016–17 season, Basham retained his place under manager Chris Wilder and played in midfield alongside Paul Coutts. Basham scored his first goal of the season – but was later sent off – in a 2–2 draw against Scunthorpe United on 24 September 2016. After serving a three-match league suspension, Basham returned on 18 October 2016 in a 3–0 win against Shrewsbury Town. This was followed by scoring in the next game, a 3–3 draw against Bradford City. Two weeks later, on 6 November 2016, Basham scored and registered an assist in a 6–0 win over Leyton Orient in the first round of the FA Cup. Due to his impressive performances, Wilder hinted that Basham could be earning a new contract, with a year to his current deal remaining. As the 2016–17 season progressed, Basham began to play in defence as a centre-back, alongside teammates such as Jack O'Connell, Ethan Ebanks-Landell and Jake Wright. In a 3–0 win over Port Vale on 14 April 2017, Basham produced an impressive display when he set up two goals. At the end of the season Sheffield United were crowned champions of League One, with Basham making 48 appearances and scoring three goals in all competitions.

In July 2017, Basham penned a new two-year contract with the Blades having played a key role in United's promotion to the Championship. On 28 April 2019, Basham saw his second promotion in three seasons with United as the Blades were promoted to the Premier League. On 1 August 2020, Basham signed a new two-year deal at Sheffield United. Basham won the Player of the Year award and Players' Player of the Year award for the 2019–20 season. On 12th May 2022, Basham signed a new two-year deal at Sheffield United, committing his future to the summer of 2024.

Personal life
Basham was born in Hebburn, Tyne and Wear. He studied at Gateshead College and trained with their Academy for Sport. He grew up supporting Sunderland. Basham considers Alan Cork as a great influence and is indebted to Cork for guiding him throughout his professional football career.

Having two years away from football, after leaving Newcastle United at sixteen, Basham worked at McDonald's. In late 2014, Basham became a father.

Career statistics

Honours
Sheffield United
EFL League One: 2016–17
EFL Championship runner-up: 2018–19

Individual
Sheffield United Player of the Year Award: 2019-20
Sheffield United Players' Player of the Year Award: 2019-20

References

External links
Profile at the Sheffield United F.C. website

1988 births
Living people
People from Hebburn
Footballers from Tyne and Wear
English footballers
Association football defenders
Association football midfielders
Newcastle United F.C. players
Bolton Wanderers F.C. players
Stafford Rangers F.C. players
Rochdale A.F.C. players
Blackpool F.C. players
Sheffield United F.C. players
National League (English football) players
English Football League players
Premier League players